Carinoclodia anancyloides is a species of beetle in the family Cerambycidae, and the only species in the genus Carinoclodia. It was described by Breuning in 1959.

References

Acanthocinini
Beetles described in 1959
Monotypic Cerambycidae genera
Taxa named by Stephan von Breuning (entomologist)